Longley may refer to:

Places
Longley, Calderdale, a location in West Yorkshire, England
Longley, Holme Valley, a location in Kirklees, West Yorkshire, England
Longley, Huddersfield, Kirklees, West Yorkshire, England
Longley, Sheffield, South Yorkshire, England
Longley, Tasmania, a locality in Australia

People
Longley (surname)

See also 
Long Lee, near Keighley, West Yorkshire, England
Longley Green, Worcestershire, England